This is a list of venues used for professional baseball in Baltimore, Maryland. The information is a synthesis of the information contained in the references listed.

Madison Avenue Grounds later Monumental Park
Home of: non-league clubs prior to 1873; Maryland – NA (1873); Baltimore – Union Association (1884 - 1 game); Baltimore Eastern League (1884 - partial season)
Location: Madison Avenue (southwest, home base); Boundary Avenue (later North Avenue) (north, beyond third base / left field); Linden Avenue (northeast, center field); old road approximating Robert Street (southeast, right field)
Currently: Residential, churches

Newington Park
Home of: Lord Baltimore – National Association (1872–1874); Baltimore Orioles – American Association (1882)
Location: Pennsylvania Avenue (northeast); Gold Street (southeast); Calhoun Street (southwest); Baker Street (northwest) – a few blocks west-southwest of the Madison Street ballpark – diamond position unknown
Currently: Residential, school, church

Oriole Park (I)
Home of: Baltimore Orioles – American Association (1883–1888)
Also used as a neutral site for one game in the 1887 World Series
Location: Sixth Street / Huntingdon Avenue (later 25th Street) (north, right field); York Road (later Greenmount Avenue) (east, first base); Barclay Street (west, right field); eventual 24th Street (south, left field)
Currently: Residential, commercial

Belair Lot a.k.a. Union Park (I)
Home of: Baltimore – Union Association (1884)
Location - adjacent to Belair Market - contradictory details from two sources:
Forrest Street (northeast); Low Street (southeast); Orleans Street (south); Gay Street (northwest)
Forrest Street (northeast); Low Street (northwest); Orleans Street end (east); East Street (southwest)
Currently: Commercial buildings, vacant lots

Oriole Park (II)
Home of: 
Baltimore Orioles – American Association (1889, mid-1891)
Baltimore Orioles – Atlantic Association (1890)
Location: 10th Street (later 29th) (north, home plate); York Road (later Greenmount) (east, third base, left field); future 9th Street (later 28th) (south, center field); future Barclay Street (west, first base, right field) – three blocks north of previous site
Currently: Residential, commercial

Union Park (II) a.k.a. Oriole Park (III)
Home of: Baltimore Orioles – American Association (mid-1891) and NL (1892–1899)
Location: 25th Street (north, home plate / third base); Barclay Street (east, left field); approximate line of Hunter Street (west, first base); approximate line of 23rd Street (south, right field) – just west of 1883–1889 site
Currently: Residential, commercial

Oriole Park (IV)
Home of: Baltimore Orioles – American League (1901–1902); Baltimore Orioles – Eastern/International League (1903–1914) 
Location: Same as 1890–1891 site – 10th Street (later 29th) (north, home plate); York Road (later Greenmount) (east, third base); 9th Street (later 28th) (south, center field); Barclay (west, first base)
Currently: Residential, commercial

Terrapin Park / Oriole Park V
Home of: Baltimore Terrapins – Federal League (1914–1915); Baltimore Orioles – IL (1916-mid-1944)
Location: 10th Street (later 29th) (south, first base); York Road (later Greenmount) (east, right field); 11th Street (later 30th) (north, left field); Vineyard Lane (originally Gilmore Lane) (northwest, third base) – just across the street to the north from previous Oriole Park; Barclay now cuts through the property.
Currently: Commercial businesses

Westport Park
Home of: Baltimore Black Sox (1917–1920)
Location: Westport neighborhood – Annapolis Road (State Highway 648) (west, home plate); Clare Street, then Waterview Avenue (to the south, right field); Patapsco River (to the east, center field); Ridgleys Cove (to the north, left field)
Currently: vacant

Maryland Park
Home of: Baltimore Black Sox – Negro leagues (1923-1932)
Location: Bush Street and a branch of Ridgleys Cove (northeast, third base); Annapolis Road (State Highway 648) (northwest, first base); Ridgleys Cove (south and southeast, outfield); half a mile or so north of Westport Park
Currently: Wheelabrator Incinerator

Bugle Field
Home of: Baltimore Black Sox – Negro leagues (1932–1934); Baltimore Elite Giants – Negro leagues (1938–1949)
Location: Federal Street (south, first base); 1601 Edison Highway (west, third base); railroad tracks (northeast, outfield)
Currently: vacant lot, previously Rockland Industries plant

Westport Stadium a.k.a. Westport Park (II)
Home of: Baltimore Elite Giants 1950
Location: Westport neighborhood – 3008 Annapolis Road (State Highway 648) (east); Baltimore-Washington Parkway (State Highway 295) (west); West Patapsco Avenue (south)
Currently: commercial / industrial

Memorial Stadium
Home of: Baltimore Orioles – IL (mid-1944–1953); Baltimore Orioles – American League (1954–1991); Bowie Baysox, Eastern League (1993)
Location: 33rd Street (south, home plate); Ellerslie Avenue (west, third base); 36th Street (north, center field); Ednor Road (east, first base)
Currently: Public park amidst commercial and residential development.

Oriole Park at Camden Yards
Home of: Baltimore Orioles – AL (1992–present)
Location: 333 West Camden Street – Camden Street (north, left field); Eutaw Street (east, right field); Briscoe and Houser Streets (south, first base); Conway Street (west, third base)

See also
Lists of baseball parks

Sources
Ballparks of North America, Michael Benson, McFarland, 1989.
House of Magic, by the Baltimore Orioles, 1991.
Green Cathedrals, by Phil Lowry, several editions.
The Home Team, by James H. Bready, several editions.
The Federal League of 1914–1915, by Marc Okkonen, SABR, 1989.
Baseball Memories, by Marc Okkonen, Sterling Publishing, 1992.

External links
History of Baltimore ballparks
Oriole Parks
Baltimore Black Sox

Baseball venues in Maryland
Baltimore
Baseball
Sports venues in Baltimore
baseball parks